Letter Box is an Australian television series which aired in 1962 on HSV-7. It was a game show in which contestants tried to build words using a series of letters supplied by the host.

The series was hosted by Bill Acfield, who was assisted by Myra Roper. It aired in a 30-minute time-slot (running time excluding commercials is not known), in black-and-white.

It was followed-up the following year with Party Time.

References

External links

1962 Australian television series debuts
1962 Australian television series endings
1960s Australian game shows
Black-and-white Australian television shows
English-language television shows
Seven Network original programming
Television game shows with incorrect disambiguation